Camp Creek is a stream in northern Ralls County, Missouri. It is a tributary of the Salt River.

Camp Creek was so named on account of a campground near its course.

See also
List of rivers of Missouri

References

Rivers of Ralls County, Missouri
Rivers of Missouri